MHSI may stand for:

 Monumenta Historica Societatis Iesu, a collection of writings on the origin and early years of the Society of Jesus
 The Military History Society of Ireland, a learned society